Gujranwala Cantonment is a cantonment adjacent to Gujranwala in Punjab province, Pakistan.

History
It was established in 1967.

References

External links
Cantonment Board Gujranwala official website
Cantonment Board Gujranwala website

Cantonments of Pakistan
Gujranwala